Kilbourne is a village in West Carroll Parish, Louisiana, United States. The population was 416 at the 2010 census.

Geography
Kilbourne is located at  (32.996064, -91.315296).

Demographics

As of the census of 2000, there were 436 people, 168 households, and 124 families residing in the village. The racial makeup of the village was 98.62% White, 0.69% African American, 0.46% Native American, 0.23% from other races. Hispanic or Latino of any race were 1.15% of the population.

There were 168 households, out of which 38.7% had children under the age of 18 living with them, 60.1% were married couples living together, 11.9% had a female householder with no husband present, and 25.6% were non-families. 21.4% of all households were made up of individuals, and 13.1% had someone living alone who was 65 years of age or older. The average household size was 2.60 and the average family size was 3.02.

In the village, the population was spread out, with 31.2% under the age of 18, 6.4% from 18 to 24, 25.0% from 25 to 44, 24.8% from 45 to 64, and 12.6% who were 65 years of age or older. The median age was 37 years. For every 100 females, there were 79.4 males. For every 100 females age 18 and over, there were 84.0 males.

The median income for a household in the village was $25,536, and the median income for a family was $34,250. Males had a median income of $39,250 versus $23,250 for females. The per capita income for the village was $13,374. About 16.0% of families and 19.9% of the population were below the poverty line, including 22.3% of those under age 18 and 25.0% of those age 65 or over.

Education
Public schools in West Carroll Parish are operated by the West Carroll Parish School Board. The village of Kilbourne is zoned to Kilbourne High School (Grades PK-12).

Notable person
Ira Gordon, American football player.

References

External links
 Kilbourne Progress Community Progress Site for Kilbourne, Louisiana

Villages in Louisiana
Villages in West Carroll Parish, Louisiana